Battle of the Nudes may refer to:

 Battle of the Nudes (engraving), a 15th-century artwork by the Italian artist Antonio del Pollaiuolo
 Battle of the Nudes (album), a 2003 album by the Canadian musician Gordon Downie